The emblem of New Caledonia consists of a nautilus shell in the foreground; the 2 symbols behind are (from left to right) a flèche faîtière, a kind of arrow which adorns the roofs of Kanak houses, thrust through tutut shells, and an Araucaria columnaris (an endemic tall pine).

Gallery

See also

Flag of New Caledonia

External links

New Caledonia
New Caledonian culture
New Caledonia
New Caledonia